The Guiyang railway loop line is a higher-speed railway in Guiyang, Guizhou Province, China.

Description
It completes a ring of railways around Guiyang. The entire loop line is 113 km in length with 17 stations. It is operated by China Railway Chengdu Group.

History
Construction began in September 2016. The freight service started on January 11, 2022. The passager service started on March 30, 2022.

Stations
List of stations on the loop line:

References

Railway loop lines
Railway lines in China
Railway lines opened in 2022